Hilltop is an extinct town in Lander County in the U.S. state of Nevada. The Geographic Names Information System classifies it as a populated place. It was named for its lofty elevation.

History
The mining district was discovered in 1906 and boomed in 1908.  In 1912, a 10-stamp amalgamation mill was built and later converted for the cyanide process. A post office was established at Hilltop in 1909 and operated until 1931.

References

External links
 Hilltop (nevadaadventures)

Ghost towns in Lander County, Nevada